Elisabetta Olga Laura Brusa (born 3 April 1954) is an Italian composer naturalised British.

Brusa was born in Milan, and as a child wrote 32 piano pieces. At the Milan Conservatory she formally studied composition with Bruno Bettinelli (who also taught famous Italian conductors like Claudio Abbado and Riccardo Muti) and Azio Corghi, graduating in 1980. She then taught Composition at the Conservatorios of Vicenza, Mantova and Brescia before arriving at the Conservatorio of Milan in 1985. She also received instruction from Sir Peter Maxwell Davies and Hans Keller. She first appeared on the Young Italian Composers RAI 3 television programme in 1983.

After winning first prize at the Washington International Competition for Composition for String Quartet in 1982, she was awarded the Fromm Music Foundation Fellowship and a Fellowship of the U.S.-Italy Fulbright Commission the next year to follow the Composition classes at the Tanglewood Music Center and three Fellowships from the MacDowell Colony later in the decade. In 1997 she married the conductor Gilberto Serembe.

Currently, she is best known for her orchestral works recorded in four volumes on the Naxos Records label. She is often inspired by works of Literature and Art as well as of Music of all ages but the latter are never quoted or imitated in her works. These include two Symphonies, the tone poem Florestan, based on the Florestan side of Robert Schumann's personality; the Nittemero Symphony, inspired by the words night and day in ancient Greek; the tone poem Messidor, which alludes strongly to (without actually quoting) Felix Mendelssohn's incidental music to A Midsummer Night's Dream (the work is dedicated to her husband), a Fanfare, an "Adagio", "Firelights", a "Requiescat", "Favole", "Merlin", "Simply Largo, all of which for orchestras of different sizes, among other works. Brusa describes her musical style as "close to Neo-Tonality and in particular to Neo-Romanticism, but in the original sense of the word, which is nowadays often confusedly assimilated to other ones," and her harmony as "essentially pandiatonic with panchromatic moments."

Her music has been performed by the BBC Symphony Orchestra, Ulster Orchestra, BBC Philharmonic, BBC Scottish Symphony Orchestra, RSNO Royal Scottish National Orchestra, CBC Vancouver Orchestra, State Hermitage Orchestra, St. Petersburg Symphony Orchestra, Tanglewood Music Center Orchestra, The Women's Philharmonic of San Francisco, to name just a few.

Notable Recordings
 Orchestral Works, volume 1 (Florestan, Messidor, La Triade, Nittemero Symphony, Fanfare): Naxos 8.555266, 21st Century Classics
 Orchestral Works, volume 2 (Firelights, Adagio, Wedding Song, Requiescat, Suite Grotesque, Favole): Naxos 8.555267, 21st Century Classics
 Orchestral Works, volume 3 (Symphony No.1, Merlin): Naxos 8.573437, 21st Century Classics
 Orchestral Works, volume 4 (Symphony No.2, Simply Largo): Naxos 8.574263, 21st Century Classics

References

External links
 
 

1954 births
Living people
Musicians from Milan
Italian classical composers
British classical composers
21st-century classical composers
20th-century classical composers
Women classical composers
Milan Conservatory alumni
Academic staff of Milan Conservatory
20th-century Italian composers
20th-century British composers
20th-century women composers
21st-century women composers
21st-century Italian composers
21st-century British composers